A list of Rugby Football League seasons since its inception as the Northern Rugby Football Union in 1895:

Seasons

External links
 Rugby Football League official website
 Super League official website

Seasons
Seasons